Roger Cook is a former garden and landscape contractor on the PBS home renovation program This Old House from 1988 until 2020. He also appears on the associated programs Ask This Old House and Inside This Old House.

Biography 
In 1977, Cook received a Bachelor of Science degree in wildlife management and conservation law from the University of Maine. A certified landscape contractor in Massachusetts, Cook is an active member of the Massachusetts Arborist Association and has served as president of the board of directors of New England Grows and the Association of Landscape Contractors of Massachusetts. Cook owns and operates K & R Tree and Landscape Company, which he and his wife, Kathleen,  founded in 1982.

Cook's first appearance on This Old House was also in 1982. At the time, he was a landscape foreman with a private company and contributed to several This Old House projects, including the Bigelow Ranch and the Woburn House. In 1988, beginning with the Lexington Bed & Breakfast renovation, Cook became a full-time cast member on the show as its garden and landscape contractor.

He currently serves on the editorial board of This Old House magazine and contributed to Complete Landscaping, published in 2004 by This Old House Books in conjunction with Sunset Books.

In June 2018, Cook announced that he would be reducing his role in the television programs due to unspecified health issues.

Cook lives with his two children in Burlington, Massachusetts, and has a cottage on Cape Cod.

On January 7, 2020, during a The Tonight Show segment, This Old House host Kevin O'Connor announced that Cook was stepping down completely from the show. He was replaced by Jenn Nawada who had appeared multiple times as a guest.

References

External links
 

Living people
American television personalities
Male television personalities
Year of birth missing (living people)
PBS people
This Old House